Alummoodan (15 March 1933  3 May 1992) was an Indian actor who worked in Malayalam films. He had acted in more than 100 films and mainly did comedy roles.

Background
Alummoodan was born to Alummoottil Joseph and Rosamma in Changanacherry. He was married to Rosamma Dominic. They have six children, 2 sons and 4 daughters. His son Boban Alummoodan is also an actor in Malayalam movies.

He died on 3 May 1992 due to a heart attack. His death occurred during the shooting of a film named Adwaitham, directed by Priyadarshan and starring Mohanlal in the lead role. He portrayed the role of a minister in Adwaitham, and his last words were the film dialogue 'Swami enne rakshikkanam' (Swami, please save me), which he told to Mohanlal, portraying the role of a saint. He died on the spot.
He was a well-known stage artist too, and he managed his own drama theatre named "Changanaserry Anaswara" even in his busy film career. One of his notable performances is in Changanaserry Geedha's famous play "Ezhu Rathrikal" written by Kalady Gopi and Directed by Sri.Geedha Chachappan. Alummoodan played "Ettukali mammoonju" a wicked character years after still remembers. Later the play made in celluloid and he appeared on the same role. "Araada Valiyavan" "Njanaada Paraayi,Moota" are some of his famous plays in the mid 1980s.

Filmography

 Again Kasargod Khader Bhai (2010) Photo Archieve
 My Dear Kuttichathan(DTS) (1997)
 Kanyakumariyil Oru Kavitha (1993)
 Adwaytham(1992)
 Kamaladalam (1992)
 Ennodu Ishtam Koodamo (1992)
 Kasargod Khader Bhai (1992)
 Ulsavamelam (1992)
 Aayushkalam (1992)
 Mimics Parade (1991)
 Vidyāraṃbhaṃ (1990)
 Appu (1990)
 Kayyethum Doorathu (1987)
 Aalippazhangal (1987) as Pachu Pilla
 Kunjaattakkilikal (1986)
 Nimishangal (Yaamam) (1986) as Druthi Keshava Pilla
 Kaanaathaaya Penkutti (1985)
 Yathra (1985)
 Mukhamukham (1984)
 Ethirppukal (1984)
 Panchavadi Palam (1984)
 My Dear Kuttichathan (1984)
 Eettillam (1983)
 Marakkillorikkalum (1983) as Gopi
 Pourusham (1983)
Thavalam (1983) as Outhakutty
 Kolakkomban (1983)
Swapname Ninakku Nandi (1983) as Broker
 Nizhal Moodiya Nirangal (1983)
 Pallaankuzhi (1983)
 Jambulingam (1982)
 Padayottam (1982)
 Panchajanyam(1982) as Thunjath
 Ee Nadu (1982) as Reporter
 Madhrasile Mon (1982)
 Thuranna Jail (1982) as Dasappan
 Dhanya (1981)
 Kadathu (1981)
Swarangal Swapnagal (1981) as Kunjiraman
 Sanchari (1981) as Palpu
 Swarnnappakshikal (1981)
 Ariyapedatha Rahasyam (1981) as Andrews
 Ellam Ninakku Vendi (1981)
 Agnisaram (1981)
 Dhruvasangamam (1981)
 Ithikkara Pakki (1980)
 Vedikkettu (1980)
 Manjil Virinja Pookkal (1980) as Khushalan
 Paalaattu Kunjikkannan (1980)
 Puzha (1980)
 Maani Koya Kurup (1979)
 Thuramukham (1979)
 Driver Madyapichirunnu (1979)
 Pichaathikkuttappan (1979)
 Maamaankam (1979)
 Vijayanum Veeranum (1979) as Appu
 Iniyum Kaanaam (1979) as Keshavan
 Tiger Salim (1978)
 Kadathanaattu Maakkam (1978)
 Avakaasham (1978)
 Arum Anyaralla (1978) as Thommi
 Kaithappoo (1978)
 Beena (1978) as Pilla
 Padmatheertham  (1978) as Krishna Pilla
 Vayanaadan Thampan (1978)
 Iniyum Puzhayozhukum (1978) as Sekhar
 Thacholi Ambu (1978)
 Yudhakaandam (1977)
 Achaaram Ammini Osharam Omana (1977) ... Gopala Pilla
 Chakravarthini (1977)
 Chathurvedam (1977)
 Chennaaya Valarthiya Kutty (1976)
 Thulavarsham (1976) as Pappachan Nair
 Paarijaatham (1976)
 Lakshmivijayam (1976)
 Abhinandanam (1976)
 Criminals (Kayangal) (1975)
 Chief Guest (1975)
 Mucheettukalikkaarante Makal (1975)
 Chalanam (1975)
 Hello Darling (1975) as Harshan Pilla
 Odakkuzhal (1975)
 Ulsavam (1975) as Swa Le
 Chattambikkalyaani (1975) as Marmam Mammad
 Penpada (1975) as Kunjiraman
 Madhurappathinezhu (1975)
 Ma Nishadha (1975)
 Neela Ponman  (1975) as Kumaran
 Kanyakumari (1974) as Bhaskaran
 Bhoogolam Thiriyunnu (1974)
 Honeymoon (1974)
 Nadeenadanmaare Aavasyamundu (1974)
 Vishnu Vijayam (1974)
 Maasappadi Maathupilla (1973)
 Enippadikal (1973)
 Ponnapuram Kotta (1973)
 Yaamini (1973) as Naanukuttan
 Football Champion (1973) as Mathew Koshi
 Panitheeratha Veedu  (1973) as Vaasu
 Omana (1972) as Padmanabha Pilla
 Gandharavakshetram (1972) as Jose
 Aadyathe Kadha (1972) as Padmanabha Pilla
 Akkarapacha (1972)
 Postmane Kananilla (1972) as Sekharan
 Oru Sundariyude Katha (1972) as Nanukuttan
 Pulliman (1972)
 Prathikaram (1972) as Peethambharan
 Aromalunni (1972)
 Professor (1972) as Raju Malathinkal
 Lora Nee Evide (1971)
 Gangaasangamam (1971)
 Sarasayya (1971) as Karunan
 Panchavan Kaadu (1971) as Chinda Swami
 Muthassi  (1971)
 Karakanakadal (1971)
 Karinizhal (1971)
 Agni Mrugam (1971)
 Marunaattil Oru Malayaali (1971) as Chandikunju
 Kalithozhi (1971)
 Line Bus (1971) as Chackochan
 Kochaniyathi (1971) as Pappu Pilla
 Aval Alpam Vaikippoyi (1971)
 Madhuvidhu (1970) as Koluthu
 Dathuputhran (1970) as Mathai
 Othenente Makan (1970) as Koman Nair
 Pearl View (1970)
 Ningalenne Communistakki (1970)...Velu
 Aa Chithrashalabham Parannotte (1970)
 Thriveni (1970)
 Kuttavaali (1970) as Master Menon
 Detective 909 Keralathil (1970)
 Thara (1970) as Pappu
 Nilakkatha Chalanangal (1970)
 Olavum Theeravum (1970)
 Nadhi (1969) as Paili
 Susie (1969)
 Koottukudumbam (1969)
 Ezhu Raathrikal (1968)
 Mainatharuvi Kolakkes (1967)
 Anarkali (1966) as Afghani warrior

References

 http://entertainment.oneindia.in/celebs/alummoodan.html
 http://imprintsonindianfilmscreen.blogspot.com.au/2012/06/alummoodan.html
 https://archive.today/20130827043618/http://cinidiary.com/peopleinfo1.php?searchtext=Alumoodan&pigsection=Actor&picata=1&Search=Search

External links

 Alummoodan at MSI

Indian male film actors
Male actors from Kerala
1992 deaths
Male actors in Malayalam cinema
People from Changanassery
20th-century Indian male actors
1933 births
Vazhappally